The American was an American automobile designed by Frank Duryea and manufactured by the American Automobile Company of New York City in 1899 to 1901.  It was a "hydro-carbon carriage" which could be started from the seat by its chain-and-sprocket gearing.

References

External links 
 Photo on Flickr

Veteran vehicles
Defunct motor vehicle manufacturers of the United States
Duryea
Motor vehicle manufacturers based in New York (state)